Maurice E. Werner  (March 24, 1932 – March 24, 2003) was an American football coach. He served as the head football coach at St. Mary of the Plains College in Dodge City, Kansas from 1977 to 1985, compiling a record of 28–59–2. Before coming to St. Mary of the Plains in 1977, Werner was the head football coach at Bishop Ward High School in Kansas City, Kansas from 1966 to 1976, tallying a mark of 78–29–3. He was the head football coach St. Xavier High School in Junction City, Kansas for three seasons before being hired as line coach at Bishop Ward in May1964.

Werner was born March 24, 1932, in Spearville, Kansas. He died on March 24, 2003, at his home in Kansas City, Kansas.

Head coaching record

College

References

External links
 

1932 births
2003 deaths
St. Mary of the Plains Cavaliers football coaches
High school football coaches in Kansas
People from Ford County, Kansas
Coaches of American football from Kansas